Ruslan Mamilov (1928-1993) was an Ingush painter and sculptor. He was an Honored Artist of the Chechen-Ingush ASSR.

Biography

Ruslan Izrailovich Mamilov was born November 7, 1928 in Ordzhonikidze, Ingush Autonomous Oblast. Nationality - Ingush.

1952 - started working in the studio of People's Artist of the Kirghiz SSR O.M. Manuilova.

1954 - worked in the Kyrgyz artistic production workshops Frunze.

In 1956 he enrolled in the Almaty Art School at the Sculpture Department, the following year he transferred to the Tbilisi Art School, where he graduated with distinction in 1958.

1958 - Work of Art and the foundry workshop at the Art Foundation of Georgia. 1960 - work in the Art Fund of the Kazakh SSR, Alma-Ata. 1962 - work in sculpture studio plant road signs of the Kazakh SSR.

1966 - Sculptor in the workshops of the Art Fund of the Russian Federation Chechen-Ingush branch.

1967 - participation in the Russian youth exhibition "The Soviet South" in Krasnodar.

1968 - completed work on a monumental Monument firefighter who died while fighting fires from the Nazi air raids on Grozny, in the same year became a member of the Union of Artists of the USSR.

1970 - awarded the medal "For Valiant Labor".

1971 - elected Chairman of the Board of the Union of Artists Chechen-Ingush ASSR, in the same year was awarded the medal "for valor".

In 1972 he was elected a delegate to the III Congress of Artists of the RSFSR, in the next year - a delegate of the IV Congress of Artists in 1973 - elected member of the Central Auditing Commission of the Union of Artists of the USSR.

In 1990 he was awarded the title "Honored Artist of the Chechen-Ingush ASSR".

Ruslan Izrailovich Mamilov was buried on February 25, 1993 in the village of Ezmi Dzheyrakhsky District Ingushetia at the family cemetery Ingush teip Mamilov`s.

Gallery

Posthumous recognition 

In the village of Dzheirakh of Ingushetia one of the streets was named in honor of Ruslan Mamilov. There also operates the house-museum of Ruslan Mamilov, opened in 2005.

External links 
 Biography of Ruslan Mamilov
 "Thank you for what was and is ..." - Article about Ruslan Mamilov on the official website of the President of Ingushetia
 Ruslan Mamilov Street in the Dzheirakh village of Ingushetia on maps Google Maps
 Reporting on the house-museum of Ruslan Mamilov online TV channel "Ingushetia"
 "In the stone breathed life" - an article in the Ingush newspaper Serdalo

Ingush people
20th-century Russian sculptors
20th-century Russian male artists
1928 births
1993 deaths